Jaylen Terelle Sims (born December 11, 1998) is an American professional basketball player for the Greensboro Swarm of the NBA G League. He played college basketball for the UNC Wilmington Seahawks.

High school career
Sims is a native of Charlotte, North Carolina, and attended United Faith Christian Academy. He was recruited by UNC Wilmington Seahawks assistant coach Doug Esleeck who had first started recruiting Sims as an assistant for the Mercer Bears. Sims' relationship with Esleeck was a major factor in his commitment to the Seahawks.

College career
Sims led the Seahawks in scoring with 17.8 points per game as a junior in the 2020–21 season. He scored a career-high 29 points in a game against the Troy Trojans on November 28, 2020.

Sims led the Seahawks in points (16.4), rebounds (5.5) and assists (2.4) per game during his senior season in 2021–22. He was selected to the first-team all-Colonial Athletic Association (CAA). The Seahawks won the 2022 College Basketball Invitational and Sims was named as most outstanding player of the tournament.

Sims declared for the 2022 NBA draft.

Professional career

Greensboro Swarm (2022–present)
Sims played with the Toronto Raptors at the 2022 NBA Summer League. On September 12, 2022, he signed with the Charlotte Hornets, his hometown team. Sims appeared in one preseason game before he was waived on October 14, 2022. On November 4, 2022, Sims was named to the opening night roster for the Greensboro Swarm.

References

External links
 College statistics

1998 births
Living people
American men's basketball players
Basketball players from Charlotte, North Carolina
Greensboro Swarm players
Guards (basketball)
UNC Wilmington Seahawks men's basketball players